James Nathaniel Anderson (born September 26, 1983) is a former American football linebacker. He played college football at Virginia Tech and was drafted in the third round (88th overall) of the 2006 NFL Draft by the Carolina Panthers.

Early career
Anderson was a high school and college football teammate of DeAngelo Hall and Darryl Tapp at Deep Creek High School and Virginia Tech.

College career
Anderson redshirted in 2001 at Virginia Tech, performing on the scout team. He played in every game in 2002, earning three starts and posting 47 tackles (28 solos) with a half sack, three stops for losses and a forced fumble. He spent the bulk of the 2003 season playing on special teams, as only four of his 41 tackles (29 solos) came during defensive action.

Anderson started 12 games at weak-side linebacker in 2004, performing in 117 special teams and 368 defensive snaps. He ranked seventh on the squad with 48 tackles (21 solos) and had 2.5 sacks with 6.5 stops behind the line of scrimmage. He also recovered two fumbles and intercepted a pass.

He started every game as a senior, ranking second on the Tech team with a career-high 82 tackles (41 solos). Anderson registered three sacks and tied for third on the team with 8.5 stops for losses. He caused and recovered a fumble, batted away three passes and had two interceptions, returning one for a touchdown.

In 53 games with the Hokies, Anderson started 28 times. He collected 218 tackles (119 solos) with seven sacks for minus-26 yards and 18 stops for losses of 75 yards. He was credited with six quarterback pressures, three fumble recoveries and two forced fumbles. Anderson also gained 53 yards with a touchdown on three interception returns and deflected five passes.

Professional career

Carolina Panthers
The Carolina Panthers selected Anderson in the third round (88th overall) of the 2006 NFL Draft. The Panthers obtained the selection as compensation for failing to re-sign cornerback Ricky Manning as a Restricted free agent.

In his debut season, he appeared in 16 games and recorded 25 tackles. He made his first career start at the Cincinnati Bengals on October 22. In the 2007 season, he played in ten games and recorded 11 tackles.

In 2011, Anderson was re-signed by the Panthers with a 5-year deal worth 22 million dollars and 8.5 million guaranteed. In 2012 against the New York Giants, Anderson recorded a franchise record 20 tackles in a single game. He was later released in March 2013 to save salary cap room. Anderson ended his tenure with 94 appearances, the most by a linebacker in Panthers history at the time of his release.

Chicago Bears
Anderson ended the 2013 season leading the Bears in tackles with 102, and tied for the team lead with 10 tackles for loss.

New England Patriots
Anderson signed with the New England Patriots on June 4, 2014. The Patriots released Anderson on August 24, 2014.

Tennessee Titans
Anderson signed with the Tennessee Titans on September 16, 2014, replacing an injured Zach Brown.

Atlanta Falcons
Signed with the Atlanta Falcons on November 20, 2014. He was released on December 24, 2014.

Dallas Cowboys
On December 30, 2014, Anderson signed with the Dallas Cowboys.

New Orleans Saints

On November 10, 2015, Anderson signed with the New Orleans Saints.

NFL statistics

Key
 GP: games played
 COMB: combined tackles
 TOTAL: total tackles
 AST: assisted tackles
 SACK: sacks
 FF: forced fumbles
 FR: fumble recoveries
 FR YDS: fumble return yards 
 INT: interceptions
 IR YDS: interception return yards
 AVG IR: average interception return
 LNG: longest interception return
 TD: interceptions returned for touchdown
 PD: passes defensed

Personal life
Anderson's nephew is former Liberty Flames starting quarterback and current Tennessee Titans quarterback Malik Willis.

James appeared on the ABC Network miniature golf reality show, Holey Moley in August 2020. He set a record for longest time on the mechanical gopher. After winning in the first round, he was defeated by the Cookie Lady on "Putt the Plank" when his tee shot landed in the sand trap.

References

External links
 Chicago Bears bio
 New England Patriots bio

1983 births
Living people
People from Roanoke Rapids, North Carolina
Sportspeople from Chesapeake, Virginia
Players of American football from Virginia
Players of American football from North Carolina
American football linebackers
Virginia Tech Hokies football players
Carolina Panthers players
Chicago Bears players
New England Patriots players
Tennessee Titans players
Atlanta Falcons players
New Orleans Saints players